Franklin Block may refer to:

Franklin Block (Brockton, Massachusetts)
Franklin Block (Portsmouth, New Hampshire), a National Register of Historic Places listing in Rockingham County, New Hampshire